Dutch profanity can be divided into several categories. Often, the words used in profanity by speakers of Dutch are based around various names for diseases. In many cases, these words have evolved into slang, and many euphemisms for diseases are in common use.

Additionally, a substantial number of curse words in the Dutch language are references to sexual acts, genitalia, or bodily functions. Religious curse words also make up a considerable part of the Dutch profanity vocabulary. Aside from these categories, the Dutch language has many words that are only used for animals; these words are insulting when applied to people. English terms often complement the Dutch vocabulary, and several English curse words are commonly in use.

Because of the prominence of the diminutive in the Dutch language, most nouns used in Dutch profanity can also be said or written in their diminutive forms.

The words listed here are mostly used in the Netherlands, not in the Flemish part of Belgium where Dutch is also spoken.

Profanity related to illness and disability
Profanity which involves diseases are commonly used in the language.

Profanity related to religion and death

Profanity related to sexuality, the human body, and animals

Ethnic and social slurs

Miscellaneous profanity

References

External links 

Profanity
Profanity by language